The Montfort Brothers of St. Gabriel (SG), otherwise Gabrielite Brothers or Frères de Saint-Gabriel (FSG), is a religious institute. Its roots go back to Louis de Montfort, who opened a few schools for poor children in La Rochelle, France, in about 1711.

History
As Louis de Monfort traveled about giving missions, he was often accompanied by brothers, whom he called to assist in his work. During the eighteenth century the life of the Community of the Holy Spirit (the Company of Mary) was centered at Saint-Laurent, where there were about fifty priests and thirty-five brothers. Of 276 missions preached from 1749 to 1799, one or two Brothers participated in 250 of them with the missionaries.

Brothers of Christian Instruction of the Holy Spirit
After the French Revolution, the congregation amalgamated under the guidance of Father Gabriel Deshayes into the Brothers they are today. Around 1824 the Brothers received official approbation under the name of Brothers of Christian Instruction of the Holy Spirit. A motherhouse, called "Saint Gabriel" was established for them separate from that of the priests. In 1853 the imperial decree of Napoleon III conferred on the Congregation the title of Brothers of Christian Instruction of Saint Gabriel.

The institute's main concern is Christian education, especially for the poor, orphans and the physically challenged. Other organizations inspired by Montfortian ideals are the Company of Mary and the Daughters of Wisdom. The 'Associates' are a lay association linked to the Gabrielites and similarly inspired by Montfortian spirituality.

One of the examples of institutions run by FSG is Assumption University (better known as ABAC from its former name of Assumption Business Administration College), which was the first university in Thailand to offer all classes in the English language. They have also established educational institutions in Canada, Singapore, Malaysia, India,  Mauritius, Spain, Italy and of course in France.

References 

 Brothers of Saint Gabriel at Catholic Encyclopedia

External links
 Montfort Brothers of St. Gabriel website
 Address of The Holy Father to The Brothers of Christian Instruction of St. Gabriel, 29 April 2000 Vatican website

 
1711 establishments in France
Institutes of Catholic religious brothers
Catholic religious institutes established in the 18th century
Catholic teaching orders